Elijah Oludele Abina (born 16 June 1935) is a Nigerian pastor and the General Overseer of The Gospel Faith Mission International (GOFAMINT) and one of the founding fathers of the Pentecostal Fellowship of Nigeria (PFN).

Early life
 Elijah Ogundele Abina was born to Pa Abraham Akowanu Abina and Madam Omoloto Abina in Aradagun, Badagry Lagos State, Nigeria. He later changed his middle name to reflect Oludele, renouncing his ties to idol worship. He is one of the founding members of The Gospel Faith Mission International (GOFAMINT), alongside Pastor Reuben George and wife, Dupe George, David Akinremi, Meshack Akinola, Iwaku Bagere, Daniel Aluko, Olusegun George, Elkanah Obideyi, Solomon Kudoro, Richard Akapo, Dorcas Adeyemi, Mary Kudoro, Felicia Akinremi (who later became his wife), Janet Oke, Dupe Akapo. This fellowship later grew to become the movement that it is today.

Pastor Abina became a full-time minister with the Gospel Faith Mission International in October 1962, resigning from his secular job from Arbico Limited, Apapa Lagos after a clear conviction from the Spirit of God. He was first, the pastor-in-charge of the GOFAMINT Iwaya Church in 1963, then pastor-in-charge of the GOFAMINT Mushin church in 1966 and later promoted to become the District Overseer. Pastor Reuben George, the then General Overseer later appointed him as his deputy, a position he faithfully served in until Pastor George passed on to glory in 1987.

After Pastor George passed on, Pastor Abina who was the Deputy General Overseer assumed the leadership of the church after a unanimous agreement by the members of the Church's Executive Council. He was installed on January 8, 1988 at the GOFAMINT International Gospel Centre, Ojoo, Ibadan, Oyo State.

Under the leadership of Pastor Abina, the Gospel Faith Mission International has witnessed tremendous increase in terms of numerical growth, geographical spread, financial strength and organizational stability. Today, the Mission has expanded from having 50 assemblies to over 2000 assemblies in Nigeria and in many parts of the world.

Personal life
Pastor Abina married Felicia Abina (née Akinremi) on 30 March 1961. Together, they have six children. Their children are Folorunsho, Olabisi, Funmilayo, Ebunoluwa, Gbenga and Femi. Matron Felicia Abina passed on in June 2014. He is known for his life of humility and exemplary Christian leadership

See Also
 Enoch Adeboye
 T.B. Joshua
 Evangelist Joseph Achanya

References

External links
 https://www.facebook.com/Pastor-Dr-Elijah-Abina-213478975379313/

1935 births
Living people
Nigerian religious leaders
Nigerian Pentecostal pastors
People from Lagos State
Yoruba Christian clergy